Yuendumu Airport  is an airport in Yuendumu, Northern Territory, Australia.

See also
 List of airports in the Northern Territory

References

Airports in the Northern Territory